(born July 10, 1953) is a Japanese science fiction writer.

Born in Niigata, Kambayashi graduated Nagaoka National College of Technology.  He debuted in 1979 with the short story "Dance with a Fox", which was an honorable mention of the 5th Hayakawa SF Contest.  He quickly became fan favorite, and he won the Seiun Award eight times (five for novels, three for short stories) during his career. In a 2006 SF Magazine poll he was ranked third best Japanese SF writer of all time; and in 2014 poll, the second.

Kambayashi received Nihon SF Taishō Award in 1995 for Kototsubo.  He was the chairman of Science Fiction and Fantasy Writers of Japan in 2001-2003.

His writing often blurs reality and alternate reality.  Early works, such as May Peace Be On Your Soul, were often compared to Philip K. Dick, as Kambayashi himself acknowledges that Dick's works led him to science fiction writing.

Probably his most popular work is Yukikaze.  It was made into an animated video series in 2002-2005.

Another popular work, Enemy Is Pirate, which consists of nine books (as of 2013), is a lighter toned space opera series.  There was an animated video series released in 1989.

Bibliography
Titles with asterisk * are short story collection.
Titles with dagger † are series story collection.

  (1981); New edition (2010) dropped "Teki wa kaizoku" and added "Rakusa", "Tsuta momiji", "Bakurei", "Kisei". *
  (1983)
  (1983)
  (1983)
  (1983) *
  (1984); Revised version:  (2002); English translation: Yukikaze (2010, published by Viz Media/Haikasoru) †
  (1985)
  (1986) †
  (1986)
  (1987)
  (1987)
  (1987) †
  (1987) *
  (1988)
  (1988)
  (1988) †
  (1989) †
  (1990)
  (1990)
  (1990) †
  (1990)
  (1991)
  (1992)
  (1992)
  (1993)
  (1993)
  (1994) †
  (1995)
  (1995)
  (1997) †
  (1997)
  (1999); English translation: Good Luck, Yukikaze (2011)
  (2001)
  (2002)
  (2003) *
  (2004) *
  (2004)
  (2005) *
  (2007)
  (2009)
  (2009) *
  (2012) *
  (2012)
  (2013)
  (2014)
  (2015)
  (2017)
  (2017)

Notes

References

External links
 Kanbayashi Chōhei in The Encyclopedia of Science Fiction
 

1953 births
Living people
Japanese science fiction writers
People from Niigata (city)